WTIL (1300 AM) is a radio station broadcasting a News Talk Information format. Licensed to Mayaguez, Puerto Rico, it serves the Puerto Rico area.  The station is currently owned by Grupo AM Puerto Rico. The station is part of the Borinquen Radio News Network and features programming from CNN en Español. The station is shared with translator station W265EC 100.9 FM, also in Mayaguez. WTIL was founded in 1950 by Gilbert Mamery, and changed owners over the years. WTIL is the second oldest radio station in the western region.

Sale to NotiRadio Broadcasting
On June 21, 2017, WTIL bought from La Mas Z Radio, Inc. to Wifredo G. Blanco Pi, swapping WBYM 1560 AM in Bayamon to La Mas Z from WTIL, in a three-way swap. The deal also involved International Broadcasting Corporation receiving land and equipment at the site of WAPA 680 AM in Carolina, PR from Blanco Pi and permission to relocate WGIT 1660 AM in Canovanas to that site and build a transmitter building, and IBC may sell or rent at $600 a month the WBYM transmitter site to La Mas Z Radio. On July 31, WTIL ended their local and Spanish Oldies format after 67 years of operation. When the transaction closed and awaiting the consummation, on August 3, this became the sixth radio station of the WAPA Radio News Network. The sale was completed on August 15, 2017.

The Borinquen Radio Network now consists of seven AM and seven FM radio stations across the island, WBQN 680 / W237FF 95.3 in San Juan, WMIA 1070 / W227DY 93.3 in Arecibo, WAPA 1260 / W268DJ 101.5 in Ponce, WTIL 1300 / W265EC 100.9 in Mayaguez, WXRF 1590 / W280FS 103.9 in Guayama, WVOZ 1580 / W286DL 105.1 in Aguadilla and WMTI 1160 / W287DR 105.3 in Barceloneta-Manati.

Translator stations

References

External links
FCC History Cards for WTIL

TIL
Radio stations established in 1951
1951 establishments in Puerto Rico
TIL